The Malabo Government Building is the residence of Teodoro Obiang Nguema Mbasogo, the President of Equatorial Guinea. It is located in Malabo, Equatorial Guinea, and was built in 1965.

Buildings and structures in Malabo
Presidential residences
1965 establishments in Africa
Buildings and structures completed in 1965